This is a list of episodes for the Disney XD animated series Pac-Man and the Ghostly Adventures.

Series overview 
{| class="wikitable plainrowheaders" style="text-align:center;"
|-
! style="padding:0 8px;" rowspan="2" colspan="2"| Season
! scope="col" style="padding:0 8px;" rowspan="2"| Episodes
! scope="col" style="padding:0 80px;" colspan="2"| Original airdates
|-
! scope="col" | First aired
! scope="col" | Last aired
|-
| scope="row" style="background:#853495; color:#50;"|
|1
| 26 
| June 15, 2013
| November 9, 2013

|-
| scope="row" style="background:#12B5D9; color:#50;"|
|2
| 13
| 
| December 2, 2014
|-
| scope="row" style="background:#00FF00; color:#50;"|
|3
| 13
| 
| 
|-
|}

Episodes

Season 1 (2013)

Season 2 (2014)

Season 3 (2015) 
This was originally pitched to English distributors as the second half of season 2. but when it was picked up in May 2015 the episodes (originally slated for 2014) were instead distributed as season 3 from June to December of 2015, and episode 40+ is still classified as season 3 as of 2016. Unlike DXD and CHRGD, the Radio Times in the United Kingdom appears to have ignored the season 3 splitting and considers episodes 40-52 to be episodes 14-26 of "series 2.

References 

Lists of American children's animated television series episodes
Lists of anime episodes
Lists of Canadian children's animated television series episodes